Juha (Jussi) Olavi Montonen (1 May 1924 Helsinki – 10 October 2015 Helsinki) was a Finnish diplomat. He was a Bachelor of Philosophy degree. He was Ambassador of Finland to Madrid in 1969–1972, in Warsaw from 1972 to 1976, Head of the Administrative Department of the Ministry for Foreign Affairs from 1976 to 1978, Ambassador México from 1978 to 1984 and Bucharest in 1984–1986. He was also the general consul in Los Angeles

References 

Diplomats from Helsinki
Ambassadors of Finland to Poland
Ambassadors of Finland to Mexico
Ambassadors of Finland to Romania
Ambassadors of Finland to Spain
1924 births
2015 deaths